Great Circle is a 2021 novel by American writer Maggie Shipstead, published on May 4, 2021, by Alfred A. Knopf.

The novel was shortlisted for the 2021 Booker Prize.

Synopsis 
The novel consists of two parallel narratives about two fictional women. One is about the disappeared 20th-century aviator Marian Graves, while the other is about a 21st-century actress, Hadley Baxter, who is cast in the role of Marian for a film about her life while struggling with the demands of being a Hollywood starlet. Hadley's narrative is told in the first-person, while Marian's sections are told in the third-person.

Reception 
Great Circle received very favorable reviews, with a cumulative "Rave" rating at the review aggregator website Book Marks, based on 22 book reviews from mainstream literary critics. The novel debuted at number fourteen on The New York Times Hardcover fiction best-seller list for the week ending May 8, 2021. Critics praised the novel for sustaining its length and for Shipstead's research and intricate novel structure for perfectly interweaving the parallel narratives, despite the time and circumstances separating them.

In its starred review, Publishers Weekly wrote, "Shipstead manages to portray both Marian's and Hadley's expanded sense of consciousness as they push the boundaries inscribed around them [...] This is a stunning feat." Kirkus Reviews, in its starred review, wrote that "Shipstead reveals breathtaking range and skill, expertly juggling a multigenerational historical epic and a scandal-soaked Hollywood satire." Kirkus also commented that "her research is as invisible as it should be, allowing a fully immersive experience." Stephanie Merritt, for The Observer, wrote, "This is a novel that invites the reader to immerse themselves in the sweep of history, the rich and detailed research, and part of the pleasure is being carried along by the narrative through all its digressions and backstories." Library Journal wrote that the novel "justifies its length, by its intricately designed plot and by giving its compelling cast of characters room to breathe." Ron Charles of The Washington Post called it a "culturally rich story that takes full advantage of its extended length to explore the changing landscape of the 20th century." However, Charles lamented that the "extraordinary realism of Marian's chapters can make the broad strokes of Hadley's sections feel light in comparison."

The novel was shortlisted for the 2021 Booker Prize, and was later shortlisted for the 2022 Women's Prize for Fiction. The novel was also longlisted for the 2022 Andrew Carnegie Medal for Excellence in Fiction.

References 

2021 American novels
Alfred A. Knopf books
American historical novels
Aviation novels
Works about aviators
First-person narrative novels
Third-person narrative novels
Novels with multiple narrators